Swan doors, or swan-wing doors, are a name given to a type of door sometimes seen on high performance or concept cars. Swan doors operate in a similar way to conventional car doors, but they open at an upward angle. This design helps to clear curbs, especially on lower sports cars, by opening slightly upward and away from the curb. The name comes from their resemblance when open to a swan with its wings open. Although there is no formal definition, swan doors are generally considered to be different from butterfly or scissor doors as they are hinged below the A pillar, open both upward and outward, and do not tilt outward like butterfly doors.  

The most well known usage of swan doors is by Aston Martin, and their sister company Lagonda, who have used the design on many of their models, starting with the DB9 in 2004. A number of cars from other manufacturers have also used the design, such as the Hennessey Venom GT and Vencer Sarthe. Some concept cars have used swan doors as well, including the Bentley EXP 10 Speed 6 and EXP 12 Speed 6e, Nissan URGE, Bertone Nuccio, and Lamborghini Asterion.

See also 

 Butterfly doors
 Canopy door
 Car door
 Gull-wing doors
 List of cars with non-standard door designs
 Scissor doors
 Sliding doors
 Suicide doors

References 

Car doors